The Central District of Ardestan County is a district (bakhsh) in Ardestan County, Isfahan Province, Iran. At the 2006 census, its population was 30,838, in 8,958 families.  The District has two cities: Ardestan and Mahabad. The District has five rural districts (dehestan): Barzavand Rural District, Garmsir Rural District, Hombarat Rural District, Kachu Rural District, and Olya Rural District.

References 

Ardestan County
Districts of Isfahan Province